Joseph Jacob Cohen (1878–1953) was an anarchist who led the Stelton and Mohegan intentional communities and edited the Yiddish anarchist periodical Fraye Arbeter Shtime.

Further reading

External links
 Personal papers archived at YIVO

1878 births
1953 deaths
American people of Russian-Jewish descent
American anarchists
American male non-fiction writers
American political writers
Anarchist writers
Editors of Fraye Arbeter Shtime
Ferrer Center and Colony
Jewish anarchists
Emigrants from the Russian Empire to the United States